"Green to Gold" is a song by Irish singer Moya Brennan and rock group Grand Canal, it was released in Ireland in 2008 as the Official song for the 2008 Irish Olympic Team, with profits from the sale of the CD being used to support the development of amateur sports in Ireland

Track listing 
"Green to Gold" (Moya Brennan & Grand Canal)
"If You Knew" (Grand Canal)

References

Ireland at the Summer Olympics
Irish songs
2008 songs
2008 in Irish music
2008 in Irish sport